Jub Baghan may refer to:
 Jub Baghan-e Olya
 Jub Baghan-e Sofla
 Shahrak-e Jub Baghan